Eckehard Schöll (born 6 February 1951 in Stuttgart, Germany) is a German physicist and mathematician as well as a  Professor of theoretical physics at the Technical University of Berlin. He is an expert in the field of nonlinear dynamics and head of the group Nonlinear dynamics and control. His work pertains to research in the fields of mathematics and physics, particularly semiconductor physics, neurodynamics and bifurcation theory. His latest research is also related to topics in biology and the social sciences, e.g.  simulation of the dynamics in  socioeconomic or neuronal networks. 
He is one of the forerunners into the research of chimera states.

Eckehard Schöll is the author of over 500 publications in scientific journals, three books (Nonequilibrium Phase Transitions in Semiconductors (Springer 1987), The Physics of Instabilities in Solid State Electron Devices (Plenum Press, New York, 1992), and Nonlinear Spatio-Temporal Dynamics and Chaos in Semiconductors (Cambridge University Press 2001)) as well as editor of several books. His Hirsch index is 72 (as of 2022) and his Einstein number is 5.

Life and career

Since 1989  Eckehard Schöll is Hochschulprofessor at the Technical University of Berlin where to date he has supervised 100 Diplom-, Master- und Bachelor thesis, 30 PhD thesis und 2 habilitations. He studied physics at the University of Tübingen (Diplom 1976) and graduated with a PhD in mathematics in 1978
from the University of Southampton (UK, doctoral advisor P. T. Landsberg). He completed a Dr. rer. nat. in 1981 under the supervision of Friedrich Schlögl 
(Genealogy] von Eckehard Schöll). He was a visiting assistant professor at the Wayne State University in Detroit, USA (1983–1984) and afterwards a guest scientist at the University of Florida, USA (1985). He finished is habilitation in 1986. He has been involved in several collaborative research centers and since 2011 he is the head of the collaborative research center SFB 910 of the Deutsche Forschungsgemeinschaft (DFG) with the topic Control of Self-Organizing Nonlinear Systems. Eckehard Schöll is involved with the Studienstiftung des deutschen Volkes, and part of the election committee of the Fulbright Program.

Eckehard Schöll is married with two children and has one grandchild.

Awards and distinctions

Eckehard Schöll was scholar of Studienstiftung des 
deutschen Volkes between 1971 und 1978. In 1997 he was awarded champion of teaching from TU Berlin for his well structured and informative 
lectures. In 2000 he received a Fulbright Senior Scholarship Award (Duke University, 
USA), as well as a Visiting Professorship der London Mathematical Society in 2004. In 2017 he was awarded an honorary doctorate of the Saratov State University, Russia.

Conferences
Being an active member of the scientific community, Eckehard Schöll has been involved in the organization of several international scientific conferences

 Short Thematic Program on Delay Differential Equations, Toronto 2015,
 Control of Self-Organizing Nonlinear Systems, Warnemünde 2014,
 Delayed Complex Systems, Palma de Mallorca 2012
 Delayed Complex Systems, Dresden 2009
 Local conference director of the 72., 76., and 79. DPG-Spring Meeting of the condensed matter section in Berlin

Works 
 
 
 
 
 

Main research
 Dynamics of networks, synchronization patterns and Chimera-states
 Chaos and noise in dynamical systems
 Analysis of dynamical systems with time delay and the control thereof.
 Nonlinear dynamics of semiconductor lasers
 Nonlinear carrier transport in semiconductor nanosstructures
 Self organization, growth kinetics and Monte-Carlo-simulations

References

External links
 
 

1951 births
Living people
21st-century German mathematicians
20th-century German mathematicians
Academic staff of the Technical University of Berlin
RWTH Aachen University alumni
University of Tübingen alumni
Alumni of the University of Southampton
Studienstiftung alumni
21st-century German physicists
20th-century German physicists
Scientists from Stuttgart